Gulzar Khan is a village of Pishin District in the Balochistan province of Pakistan. It is located at 31°1'40N 67°10'5E to the north of the district capital Pishin with an altitude of 2384 metres (7824 feet).

References

Populated places in Pishin District